Edson de Araújo Jr. (born: 14 July 1969) is a sailor from Florianópolis, Brazil. who represented his country at the 1996 Summer Olympics in Savannah, United States as crew member in the Soling. With helmsman Daniel Glomb and fellow crew member Marcelo Reitz they took the 21st place.

References

Living people
1969 births
Sailors at the 1996 Summer Olympics – Soling
Olympic sailors of Brazil
Sportspeople from Florianópolis
Brazilian male sailors (sport)